Kris Sivara (Thai: กฤษณ์ สีวะรา, alternatively transcribed as Srivara) (27 March 1914 – 28 April 1976) was a military officer of the Royal Thai Army, a member of the Thai Cabinet, and deputy commander-in-chief of the Royal Thai Army during the violent crackdown on democracy protesters on 14 October 1973.  He was later promoted to army commander.

Career
During the Burma Campaign in World War II, Kris served as a company commander in a Phayap Army battalion under the command of Major Sarit Thanarat.

Kris was appointed Deputy Minister of Education by Field Marshal Thanom Kittikachorn in his 1969 government. On 23 November 1970, he was switched to Deputy Minister of Defence (Thanom was both premier and minister of defence). The government fell on 17 November 1971 after Thanom led a coup that overthrew his own government and abrogated the 1968 constitution.  Thanom appointed Kris Minister of Industry in his subsequent junta.

Kris played a pivotal role in the 14 October democracy movement of 1973. Kris served as Deputy Army Commander in the face of massive public demonstrations against the "three tyrants": Colonel Narong Kittikachorn, Army Commander Field Marshal Praphas Charusathien, and Prime Minister and Supreme Commander Thanom Kittikachorn.  On the evening of 14 October, the police and army began shooting at demonstrators, killing at least 70.  Narong shot into the crowds from a helicopter. Thanom and Praphas resigned from their political roles, but continued to lead the military. They ordered more troops to confront the remaining demonstrators, but were blocked by Kris. Thanom and Narong then resigned from their military positions. The king then appointed Sanya Dharmasakti as premier. Kris was named defense minister in 1976, but died a week later in April 1976. His death has been called "...sudden and strange..."

Kris's role in the events was countered by Narong in a 2003 book. Narong blamed Kris, among others, for the violence. The book was strongly criticised by former student leaders.

The army's Kris Sivara Camp in Sakon Nakhon Province is named after him.

Honour
1966 -  Knight Grand Cordon of the Most Exalted Order of the White Elephant

1963 -  Knight Grand Cordon of the Most Noble Order of the Crown of Thailand

1969 -  Dame Grand Commander of the Most Illustrious Order of Chula Chom Klao

1962 -  Victory Medal - World War II

1974 -  Freemen Safeguarding Medal (First Class)

1934 -  Safeguarding the Constitution Medal

1969 -  Border Service Medal

1947 -  Chakra Mala Medal

1950 -  King Ananda Mahidol's Royal Cypher Medal 4th

1953 -  King Bhumibol Adulyadej's Royal Cypher Medal 3rd

Foreign honour

  :

1964 -  Grand Cross of the Order of Leopold II

 

1969 -  Tongil Medal of the Order of National Security Merit

 

1969 -  Grand Cordon of the Order of the Cloud and Banner

 

1969 -   Exceptional class of the Order of Kim Khanh

 

1972 -  Order of the British Empire (Military)

1973 -  Grand Meritorious Military Order Star 1st Class

 

1975 -  Honorary Grand Commander of the Order of Loyalty to the Crown of Malaysia

 

1975 -  Philippine Legion of Honor (Rank of Commander)

References

Further reading
 Paul M. Handley, "The King Never Smiles" Yale University Press: 2006,

External links
 The Nation, "Uprising: Narong 'is distorting history'", 31 Aug 2003

1914 births
1976 deaths
Kris Sivara
Kris Sivara
Kris Sivara
Kris Sivara
Kris Sivara
Honorary Grand Commanders of the Order of Loyalty to the Crown of Malaysia
Kris Sivara
Kris Sivara
Kris Sivara